Parthenothrips is a genus of thrips in the family Thripidae. There is one described species in Parthenothrips, P. dracaenae.

References

Further reading

 
 
 
 
 
 

Thripidae
Articles created by Qbugbot